The Minister of Health and Care Services is a councilor of state and chief of the Norway's
Ministry of Health and Care Services. Since 14 October 2021 the position has been held by Ingvild Kjerkol of the Labour Party. The ministry is responsible for healthcare and care services, with the state's healthcare activities being carried out by four regional health authorities. Major institutions subordinate to the ministry include the Directorate for Health, the Board of Health Supervision, the Institute of Public Health, the Medicines Agency, the Radiation Protection Authority, the Labour and Welfare Service and the Food Safety Authority.

The position was created in 1992 and originally held the healthcare portfolio of the Ministry of Social Affairs. The remainder of the ministry's portfolio was taken care of by the Minister of Social Affairs. From 2002 the position has been chief of its own ministry. The position has been held by eleven people from three parties. Bent Høie has held the position the longest, for a total of eight years.

Key
The following lists the minister, their party, date of assuming and leaving office, their tenure in years and days, and the cabinet they served in.

Ministers

Minister of the Elderly and Public Health
The Minister of the Elderly and Public Health was responsible for cases related to the elderly and public health. It was abolished on 24 January 2020.

Key

Ministers

References

Health and Care Services